Léon Barsacq (18 October 1906 – 23 December 1969) was a Russian-born and naturalized French production designer, art director and set decorator. He was nominated for an Academy Award in the category Best Art Direction for the film The Longest Day. He was the brother of French theatre director André Barsacq and the father of film actor Yves Barsacq.

Selected filmography
 Compliments of Mister Flow (1936)
 Southern Mail (1937)
 I Was an Adventuress (1938)
 Beating Heart (1940)
 The Mysteries of Paris (1943)
 Children of Paradise (1945)
 The Last Vacation (1948)
 Eternal Conflict (1948)
 White Paws (1949)
 Maya (1949)
 The Glass Castle (1950)
 Two Pennies Worth of Violets (1951)
 Imperial Violets (1952)
 The Beauty of Cadiz (1953)
 Their Last Night (1953)
 The Lady of the Camellias (1953)
 All the Gold in the World  (1961)
 The Longest Day (1962)

References

External links

1906 births
1969 deaths
People from Feodosia
People from Taurida Governorate
French production designers
French art directors
French set decorators
Soviet emigrants to France